T. Suvarna Raju is the former chairman and managing director of Hindustan Aeronautics Limited which is an Indian Public Sector Undertaking under the Government of India.

Biography
T. Suvarna Raju, took over as Chairman, HAL on 1 February 2015. He joined HAL in 1980 as Management Trainee and has worked in different capacities at HAL, before taking over as Director, Design & Development in 2012. He is also the first Member Secretary of Design Development Management Board established by Ministry of Defence (India).

Development programmes
He was actively involved in the research and development programmes for the light combat aircraft the HAL Tejas, HAL HTT-40.

External links
Chairman and Managing Director of Hindustan Aeronautics Limited.

References

Living people
Year of birth missing (living people)